Sipan Shiraz (June 25, 1967 – April 15, 1997) was an Armenian poet, sculptor and painter.

Biography
Born Sipan Hovhannesi Karapetyan, he was the son of Armenian poet Hovhannes Shiraz and his second wife, Shushanik. He studied sculpting at Panos Terlemezyan State Art College and Yerevan State Art Institute. Shiraz was an author of poetry books and memoirs about his father. He was a member of the Writers Union of Armenia and also worked at Yerevan radio. According to poet Artashes Ghazaryan, "Sipan lived as a meteor".

During his short life he published 7 books of poems. He is buried at Yerevan Central Cemetery’s Pantheon.

Bibliography
Mahamerdz tari, Yerevan, 1992, 149 p., 
Hayrik, Yerevan, 1993, 103 p.
Selected poems, 2008, 272 p.

References

External links
Sipan Shiraz

Sipan Shiraz
In Memory of Sipan, Aravot daily

Artists from Yerevan
20th-century Armenian poets
1997 deaths
1967 births
Armenian male poets
Armenian sculptors
Armenian painters
20th-century male writers
Writers from Yerevan